The ISI mark is a standards-compliance mark for industrial products in India since 1950. The mark certifies that a product conforms to an Indian standard (IS) developed by the Bureau of Indian Standards (BIS), the national standards body of India. The ISI mark is by far the most certification mark in the Indian subcontinent. The ISI is an initialism of Indian Standards Institution, the name of the national standards body at 1 January 1978, when it was renamed to the Bureau of the Indian Standards. The ISI mark is mandatory for a certain products to be sold in India, such as many of the electrical appliances like switches, electric motors, wiring cables, heaters, kitchen appliances, etc., and other products like Portland cement, LPG valves, LPG cylinders, automotive tyres, etc. In the case of most other products, ISI marks are optional.

Counterfeiting 
It is very common in India to find products with fake ISI marks. That is, industrial traders cheat customers by affixing ISI marks on the product without actually certified. Fake ISI marks usually do not carry
(i) the mandatory 7-digit licence number (of the format CM/L-xxxxxxx, where x signifies a digit from the licence number) required by BIS; and
(ii) the IS number on top of the ISI mark which signifies the Indian standard a particular product is in compliance with. 

For example, if a kitchen grinder's box has a small ISI mark on it with the ISI code of the appliance's wire, one can conclude that the wire is BIS-certified but the appliance itself is not an BIS-certified product. Counterfeiting ISI marks is a punishable offence by the law, but enforcement is uncommon.

See also 
 Certification marks in India

Notes

References 
9. ISI Mark Certification Process, Documents Required, and list of the Products under BIS Certification Scheme -   Aleph INDIA
Certification marks in India
Industry in India
Standards of India